Cold Cold Water EP is an EP by artist Mirah,  released on March 19, 2002, on K Records.   It includes the studio version of "Cold Cold Water" with acoustic renditions of songs from her Advisory Committee album.

The song "Cold Cold Water" was remixed by the French artists Electrosexual & Abberline for Mirah's Joyride: Remixes album, in 2006.

Reception

It received a positive review in Pitchfork, who praised the title track, stating "the song is deadly serious, dark, and full of the kind of not-so vague sexual innuendos we've come to expect from Mirah. Then, Phil Elvrum's panoramic, Morricone-esque production technique explodes onto the soundstage with swelling strings, huge crashing cymbals, mammoth tympani, and strikingly effective hoof-clopping sounds." It called the other three tracks "admirable bedroom folk."

Track listing

Personnel

Mirah - primary artist
Phil Elvrum - production
Calvin Johnson - recording

References

External links
MirahMusic.com

2002 EPs
Mirah albums
K Records EPs